Ousmane Dramé (born 25 August 1992) is a French footballer who playsas a winger for Portuguese club C.D. Cova da Piedade.

Career

Early career
Of Malian descent, Dramé began his career playing for the Centre de Formation de Paris, a youth sporting club designed to cater only to football players under the age of 19. The center has produced the likes of Jérémy Ménez and Franck Tabanou, among many others. While at the academy, Dramé was teammates with Prince-Désir Gouano, as well as defender Willy Boly. He left the center in 2007 to sign with professional club Guingamp. After three years in the club's youth academy, he was released in 2010.

Padova
After failing to earn a professional contract in France, Dramé ventured to neighboring Italy eventually securing a contract with Serie B club Padova until June 2014. After spending the first half of the 2010–11 season playing in the Campionato Nazionale Primavera, he was called up to the senior team for the first time by new incoming manager Alessandro Dal Canto in April 2011 for a league match against Empoli. Dramé failed to appear in the match, but made his professional debut the following week in a 3–1 win over Portogruaro appearing as a substitute. He remained a regular in the team for the rest of the campaign appearing as a substitute in all of his appearances, which included both matches against Novara in the Serie B playoffs, which Padova lost 2–1 on aggregate.

Dramé became a starter in the 2011–12 season and made his first of the campaign on 21 August 2011 in the team's 2–1 defeat to Bologna in the Coppa Italia. On 30 August, he made his professional league start against Reggina. In the match, Dramé scored his first professional goal as Padova won the match 1–0. According to his agent, Dramé's performances at club level have led to interest from English club Arsenal, as well as Serie A clubs Fiorentina and Palermo.

Sporting
In 2014, Dramé signed a contract with Sporting Clube de Portugal to be a part of their B team.

Personal life
On 22 April 2013, Dramé was charged by the Italian police for stealing a purse from a prostitute and for injuring a friend of the prostitute who tried to take the purse back from Dramé.

Career statistics

Notes

Honours
Moreirense
Taça da Liga: 2016–17

References

External links
 
 
 

1992 births
Living people
Footballers from Paris
Association football wingers
French footballers
Malian footballers
French people of Malian descent
Calcio Padova players
Ascoli Calcio 1898 F.C. players
U.S. Lecce players
Venezia F.C. players
Sporting CP footballers
Moreirense F.C. players
Belenenses SAD players
C.D. Cova da Piedade players
Serie B players
Primeira Liga players
French expatriate footballers
Expatriate footballers in Italy
Expatriate footballers in Portugal
French expatriate sportspeople in Italy
French expatriate sportspeople in Portugal